Golovnin is a Russian masculine surname, its feminine counterpart is Golovnina. It may refer to
Maria Golovnina (1980–2015), Japanese-Russian journalist
Vasily Golovnin (1776–1831), Russian admiral

See also
Golovin (disambiguation)

Russian-language surnames